St. Crumnathy's Cathedral Achonry, is a former cathedral in the Republic of Ireland.

Dedicated to St Nathy, it was formerly in the Diocese of Achonry, and then the joint cathedral of Killala and Achonry. It was rebuilt in 1823 at a cost of £1066 with a grant from the Board of First Fruits. It was then one of three cathedrals in the Diocese of Tuam, Killala and Achonry until it was deconsecrated in 1998. It is now a protected structure.

Notes

 
Achonry
Religion in County Sligo
Former churches in the Republic of Ireland